Brice Mabaya (born 19 April 1986) is a Chadian professional football player. He has made six appearances for the Chad national football team.

See also
 List of Chad international footballers

References

External links
 

1986 births
Living people
Chadian footballers
Chad international footballers
Place of birth missing (living people)
Association football goalkeepers